Bobby Miguel Price (born April 25, 1998) is an American football safety for the Detroit Lions of the National Football League (NFL). He played college football at Norfolk State.

College career
Price played collegiate football at Norfolk State. During his freshman season, he played in nine games, and started four games at free safety. During his sophomore season, he started in all 11 games and ranked fourth on the team, and tied for 18th in the MEAC with 69 tackles. During his junior season, he started all 10 games he played and ranked fourth on the team with 59 tackles. He also posted 2.5 tackles-for-loss, two interceptions, deflected eight passes, recovered two fumbles, and tied for fourth in the MEAC with 10 passes defended. Following the season he earned All-MEAC third-team honors. Price also participated with the NSU track and field team in the spring, where he placed fourth in the long jump at the MEAC indoor championships in February, and won the MEAC outdoor long jump championship, with a personal-best jump of 25 feet, 10.25 inches.

During his senior season, he started all 12 games at strong safety and finished the season with 73 tackles, including 2.5 tackles-for-loss, eight pass breakups, recovered two fumbles, and returned his lone interception 84-yards for a touchdown. He ranked 16th in the MEAC in tackles, 10th in passes defended and tied for third in fumble recoveries. Following the season he earned All-MEAC second-team honors. Price finished his career with 229 tackles, eight for loss, seven interceptions, 23 pass breakups and four fumble recoveries.

Professional career
Price signed with the Detroit Lions as an undrafted free agent on May 1, 2020. He was waived during final roster cuts on September 5, 2020, and signed to the team's practice squad the next day. He was elevated to the active roster on December 5 and December 12 for the team's weeks 13 and 14 games against the Chicago Bears and Green Bay Packers, and reverted to the practice squad after each game. On January 2, 2021, Price was promoted to the active roster.

On October 22, 2022, Price was placed on injured reserve.

References

External links
Detroit Lions bio

1998 births
Living people
American football safeties
Detroit Lions players
Norfolk State Spartans football players
Players of American football from Virginia
Sportspeople from Virginia Beach, Virginia
African-American players of American football
21st-century African-American sportspeople